Karmanovo is the name of several rural localities in Russia:
Karmanovo, Tatyshlinsky District, Republic of Bashkortostan, a village in Bul-Kaypanovsky Selsoviet of Tatyshlinsky District of the Republic of Bashkortostan
Karmanovo, Yanaulsky District, Republic of Bashkortostan, a selo in Karmanovsky Selsoviet of Yanaulsky District of the Republic of Bashkortostan
Karmanovo, Kaluga Oblast, a village in Yukhnovsky District of Kaluga Oblast
Karmanovo, Kostroma Oblast, a village in Loparevskoye Settlement of Galichsky District of Kostroma Oblast
Karmanovo, Kursk Oblast, a selo in Karmanovsky Selsoviet of Zheleznogorsky District of Kursk Oblast
Karmanovo, Taldomsky District, Moscow Oblast, a village in Tempovoye Rural Settlement of Taldomsky District of Moscow Oblast
Karmanovo, Zaraysky District, Moscow Oblast, a village in Karinskoye Rural Settlement of Zaraysky District of Moscow Oblast
Karmanovo, Borovichsky District, Novgorod Oblast, a village in Peredskoye Settlement of Borovichsky District of Novgorod Oblast
Karmanovo, Moshenskoy District, Novgorod Oblast, a village in Kirovskoye Settlement of Moshenskoy District of Novgorod Oblast
Karmanovo, Omsk Oblast, a village in Khokhlovsky Rural Okrug of Sargatsky District of Omsk Oblast
Karmanovo, Smolensk Oblast, a selo in Karmanovskoye Rural Settlement of Gagarinsky District of Smolensk Oblast
Karmanovo, Republic of Tatarstan, a selo in Zainsky District of the Republic of Tatarstan
Karmanovo, Firovsky District, Tver Oblast, a village in Velikooktyabrskoye Rural Settlement of Firovsky District of Tver Oblast
Karmanovo, Kuvshinovsky District, Tver Oblast, a village in Borzynskoye Rural Settlement of Kuvshinovsky District of Tver Oblast
Karmanovo, Udomelsky District, Tver Oblast, a village in Ryadskoye Rural Settlement of Udomelsky District of Tver Oblast